Eduardo de Salles Oliveira, known as just Edu Salles, is a striker and most recently played in the Xerez Deportivo FC.

Career statistics

(Correct )

Contract
 Atlético Paranaense.

References

External links
 ogol.com

1990 births
Living people
Brazilian footballers
Club Athletico Paranaense players
Expatriate footballers in Thailand
Association football forwards
Footballers from Curitiba